Xavier de Montclos (30 August 1924 – 21 September 2018) was a 20th–21st-century French historian, a specialist of the history of religions and particularly christianity.

Career 
In 1965, he defended his thesis devoted to Lavigerie, le Saint-Siège et l'Église, de l'avènement de Pie IX à l'avènement de Léon XIII, 1846-1978. In 1966, he supported a complementary thesis on Le toast d'Alger, documents, 1890-1891.

He is emeritus professor at the Lumière University Lyon 2.

In 1967, Xavier de Montclos was awarded the Prix Broquette-Gonin in literature for his Le Toast d’Alger (1890-1891).

Works 
Histoire religieuse de la France, Paris, Presses universitaires de France, 1988
 .
 .
Brève histoire de l'Église de France, Paris, Éditions du Cerf, 2002
 L'ancienne bourgeoisie en France du XVIe au XXe siècle, Paris, Christian, 2005

References

External links 
 Xavier de Montclos on data.bnf.fr
 L'Ancienne bourgeoisie en France, Xavier De Montclos on YouTube
 Xavier de Montclos on the site of the Académie française

20th-century French historians
21st-century French historians
French historians of religion
Historians of Christianity
Winners of the Prix Broquette-Gonin (literature)
1924 births
2018 deaths